Kerry Jayne Elizabeth Katona (born 6 September 1980) is a British media personality and singer. She was a member of girl group Atomic Kitten from 1998 until her first departure in 2001 and again from 2012 until her second departure in 2017.

Katona was the winner of the third series of I'm a Celebrity...Get Me Out of Here! in 2004, making her the first queen of the jungle, and was runner-up of Celebrity Big Brother 8 in 2011. In 2021 she competed in the third series of Celebrity SAS: Who Dares Wins.

Early life
Katona was born in Warrington, Cheshire. Katona's maternal grandfather is Hungarian who fled Budapest to London during the Second World War. As a child she was placed in care and brought up by four sets of foster parents and attended eight different schools. She left school at sixteen to become a lap dancer, then joined a dance troupe that toured Europe.

Career
In 1999, 18-year-old Katona rose to fame as a member of Atomic Kitten, an all-female pop trio created by Orchestral Manoeuvres in the Dark frontman Andy McCluskey. Their debut single, "Right Now", was released in late November 1999 and reached number 10 on the UK Singles Chart. Their second single, "See Ya", followed in March 2000 and was an even bigger success, reaching number six. Following this initial success, Atomic Kitten performed an Asian tour and scored their first number one hit there with "Cradle". The album, Right Now, was first released in Japan on 16 March 2000, and subsequently released in the United Kingdom on 23 October 2000 following the release of two further singles, "I Want Your Love" and "Follow Me". In 2000, the group also recorded a cover version of "The Locomotion" for the movie Thomas and the Magic Railroad.

Right Now was unsuccessful upon its first release, peaking at number 39 in the UK album chart. Atomic Kitten's record label, Innocent Records, was considering dropping them because of their limited success, but were persuaded to allow the group to release one more single from the album, "Whole Again". However, Katona left the group several days before the single's release because she was pregnant. Though Katona's vocals are featured in the original release of "Whole Again" and she appears in its music video, former Precious singer Jenny Frost replaced Katona in the lineup and the single was re-recorded. "Whole Again" became the group's first number one hit in the United Kingdom and stayed at the top for four consecutive weeks. Due to this success, "Whole Again" was released globally and reached number one in 18 other countries, including six weeks in Germany and New Zealand.

After marrying Brian McFadden and taking his surname, Katona moved into television work, appearing on and presenting a mix of light-entertainment programmes such as Britain's Sexiest..., Loose Women, and elimiDATE. She appeared on Lily Savage's Blankety Blank in 2001. In February 2004, she won the third series of the British reality TV show I'm a Celebrity... Get Me Out of Here!. That July, she and McFadden appeared as judges on the RTÉ talent show You're a Star, which was used to select the Republic of Ireland's Eurovision Song Contest entry. Katona separated from McFadden in September 2004 and reverted to her maiden name.

In July 2005 Katona starred in My Fair Kerry on ITV. She also starred in an Irish drama called Showbands that year.

Between 2007 and 2009, Katona was the subject of three MTV reality shows: Kerry Katona: Crazy in Love, Kerry Katona: Whole Again, and Kerry Katona: What's the Problem? From a peak audience of 500,000 for Kerry Katona: Crazy in Love, viewership for Kerry Katona: What's the Problem?, a series about Katona's bipolar disorder, slumped to just 19,000 and MTV dropped her in August 2009. In late 2009, Katona attempted to become a contestant on Celebrity Big Brother 2010 but was rejected by the show's executives after she failed the required psychological tests.

Katona's reality show Kerry Coming Clean aired on 24 June 2010. Katona was a contestant on Dancing on Ice Series 6 with English ice skater Daniel Whiston. They were eliminated in week five in a skate-off against Jeff Brazier and partner Isabelle Gauthier.

Katona was the first housemate to enter the Big Brother House for the 2011 series of Celebrity Big Brother alongside Amy Childs and Tara Reid and others. She was voted the runner-up in the final after Paddy Doherty on 8 September 2011.

In March 2012, Hamilton confirmed that Atomic Kitten were reuniting for a summer tour and stated that she hoped Katona would join them on stage for a performance. The reunion was later dismissed by all three members due to a fight between Katona and Frost. In June 2012, Katona performed for the first time in over 11 years at Birmingham's Gay Pride, singing some of her Atomic Kitten hits including Whole Again and Right Now. On 18 October it was announced that the original members of Atomic Kitten would reunite for an ITV2 series along with other pop groups of their era, including B*Witched, Five, Liberty X and 911. In November 2012 Katona confirmed she had re-joined Atomic Kitten, replacing Jenny Frost.

In 2019, Katona appeared in the sixth series of E4 reality series Celebs Go Dating. In November 2022, having previously appeared as a guest co-host earlier in the year, Katona became the permanent co-host of the Wheel of Misfortune podcast alongside comedian Alison Spittle.

Other projects
Formerly represented by publicist Max Clifford, with whom she parted by mutual agreement in October 2008, Katona has had endorsement deals with Iceland and Asda supermarkets. On 17 August 2009, Iceland released Katona from her £290,000 contract. The company stated that it was "impossible" to continue featuring Katona in its advertising campaigns after photographs appeared in the News of the World tabloid, allegedly showing her taking cocaine in the bathroom of her home.

Katona has released two autobiographies, Kerry Katona: Too Much, Too Young and Still Standing: The Autobiography; a self-help book, Survive the Worst and Aim for the Best: How to Get Your Life Back on Track; and three novels, Tough Love, The Footballer's Wife, and Glamour Girl. All of her books have been ghostwritten. Until 2008, she wrote a regular column for OK! Magazine. Then again until December 2012. On 11 May 2016, Katona rejoined the panel of Loose Women since leaving the series in 2004.

Katona is a patron of The Shannon Bradshaw Trust, a Warrington-based charity which helps children with life-threatening conditions and their families.

In March 2016, Katona launched an online bingo site called Bingo With Kerry. In May 2016 the site won 'New Site of the Year' at the WhichBingo Awards and 'Best casino site' at the New Casino Sites Awards in 2017. She competed in the third series of Celebrity SAS: Who Dares Wins, which began airing on 29 August 2021.

Personal life

Family
Katona has five children from three marriages. She married former Westlife singer Brian McFadden on 5 January 2002, at the Church of the Immaculate Conception in Rathfeigh, County Meath, Ireland. They have two daughters. McFadden filed for divorce from Katona in September 2004 and was separated for two years, until their divorce was finalised in December 2006.

On 14 February 2007 Katona married taxi driver Mark Croft. They have a daughter (b.2007) and a son (b.2008). In her 2012 book, Still Standing: The Autobiography, Katona describes meeting Croft when he was supplying cocaine to her mother Sue in September 2005. Katona had just returned to Warrington after spending six weeks in rehab in Arizona for depression, alcohol and drugs. They announced a breakup in 2009 but reconciled, then divorced in 2011.

Katona married former rugby league (Warrington Wolves A-Team) player George Kay on 14 September 2014. They have one daughter (b.2014), Kay had served three years of a six-year jail sentence after being convicted for blackmail in 2008. On 7 October 2015, Katona announced their separation after he allegedly assaulted her at their home in Crowborough and was subsequently arrested by police. Kay was charged with assault by beating and possessing a banned weapon, but these charges were later dropped due to lack of evidence. Like Katona, Kay had mental health issues, and died on 5 July 2019 after an overdose. Like her mother Sue before her, Katona was diagnosed with bipolar disorder in 2005 and has been campaigning to increase awareness of mental health problems. Katona also has dyslexia and attention deficit hyperactivity disorder.

Legal issues
On 15 July 2007, Katona, Croft, and their young daughter Heidi were held hostage at their £1.5 million home in Wilmslow, Cheshire. Three men forcibly entered their home, one of them holding Katona at knife-point while the others forced Croft to show them where valuables were kept. Nobody was physically harmed, but the men left with a blue BMW and other valuables with an estimated total value between £100,000 and £150,000. That same day, Katona was admitted to the Priory Hospital with bipolar disorder. Her publicist, Max Clifford, claimed she had had the disorder for some time, but the trauma had aggravated her symptoms.

On 21 August 2008, Katona was declared bankrupt at the High Court in London after failing to pay the final £82,000 of a £417,000 tax bill.

On 2 July 2013, Katona filed for bankruptcy at County Court in Wigan.

On 8 May 2019, Brighton Magistrates' Court ordered Katona to pay a £500 fine after the school attendance rate of one of her children had fallen below 50% in 2018. Her solicitor argued that Katona did not have childcare and had to take the child to work with her. During a previous hearing, Katona had pleaded "not guilty" and announced she would represent herself in court.

Filmography

Discography

Writing
Emily Herbert's biography of Katona, Kerry: Story of a Survivor, appeared in September 2005.

Katona released her autobiography Too Much, Too Young on 5 October 2006, written with ghostwriter Fanny Blake and Sue Katona, who consented to have her story told as well.

In October 2007, Katona released her first novel. Tough Love (produced with the aid of a ghost-writer) follows the story of the Crompton family and was published by Ebury Press. A second ghostwritten novel, The Footballer's Wife, was published in 2008. In 2012, Katona released her second autobiography, Still Standing: The Autobiography.

Modelling
Katona is also well known for her glamour modelling. She first posed for Page 3 at the age of 17. Katona has also posed for the men's publication Zoo. She has also done glamour modelling for a host of other high-profile publications appearing in the likes of New!, Now Magazine. and Star.

Two months after having £15,000 worth of plastic surgery, which included having a breast reduction as she had her 32GG breasts reduced to an E cup in August 2008, Katona posed for Zoo Magazine in October 2008.

She launched her own official OnlyFans account in May 2020.

See also
 List of Celebrity Big Brother (British TV series) housemates
 List of Dancing on Ice contestants
 List of I'm a Celebrity...Get Me Out of Here! (British TV series) contestants

References

External links
Kerry Katona This Morning Interview

Kerry Katona's biography at Random House
Kerry Katona's biography at Biogs

1980 births
Living people
Atomic Kitten members
English autobiographers
English child singers
English women pop singers
English people of Hungarian descent
English television personalities
English television presenters
English women novelists
I'm a Celebrity...Get Me Out of Here! (British TV series) winners
People with bipolar disorder
People from Warrington
British women columnists
20th-century English women singers
20th-century English singers
21st-century English women singers
21st-century English singers
Musicians with dyslexia
OnlyFans creators